
Gmina Barciany is a rural gmina (administrative district) in Kętrzyn County, Warmian-Masurian Voivodeship, in northern Poland, on the border with Russia.

Villages
Gmina Barciany contains the villages and settlements of:

  Aptynty
  Arklity
  Asuny
  Barciany
  Błędowo
  Bobrowo
  Cacki
  Czaczek
  Dębiany
  Dobrzykowo
  Drogosze
  Duje
  Frączkowo
  Garbnik
  Garbno
  Gęsie Góry
  Gęsiki
  Gęsiniec Wielki
  Glinka
  Główczyno
  Górki
  Gradowo
  Gumniska
  Kiemławki Małe
  Kiemławki Wielkie
  Kolwiny
  Kotki
  Krelikiejmy
  Krymławki
  Krzeczewo
  Kudwiny
  Maciejki
  Markławka
  Markuzy
  Michałkowo
  Modgarby
  Mołtajny
  Momajny
  Moruny
  Niedziałki
  Niedziały
  Ogródki
  Pastwiska
  Pieszewo
  Piskorze
  Podławki
  Radoski Dwór
  Radosze
  Rodele
  Rowy
  Ruta
  Rutka
  Rzymek
  Silginy
  Skandawa
  Skierki
  Skoczewo
  Sławosze
  Solkieniki
  Staniszewo
  Stary Dwór Barciański
  Suchawa
  Święty Kamień
  Szaty Wielkie
  Taborzec
  Wielewo
  Wilkowo Małe
  Wilkowo Wielkie
  Winda 
  Zalewska Góra

Neighbouring gminas
Gmina Barciany is bordered by the gminas of Kętrzyn, Korsze, Sępopol and Srokowo. It also borders Russia (Kaliningrad oblast).

References

Polish official population figures 2006

Barciany
Kętrzyn County